Raffaello Ivaldi (16 December 1997) is an Italian slalom canoeist who has competed at the international level since 2012. He trains in Ivrea, Italy and is studying law at the University of Verona.

Ivaldi won a bronze medal in the C1 team event at the 2022 ICF Canoe Slalom World Championships in Augsburg. He won a silver and a bronze medal in the C1 team event at the European Championships. He has also won three medals at the ICF World Junior and U23 Canoe Slalom Championships, with two golds in C1 team (2019, 2015) and one silver in C1 (2018). He earned his best senior world championship result of 15th at the 2019 ICF Canoe Slalom World Championships in La Seu d'Urgell.

His brother Zeno Ivaldi is also a slalom canoeist, as was his father Ettore Ivaldi.

Results

World Cup individual podiums

Complete World Cup results

References

External links 

 

1997 births
Living people
Italian male canoeists
Medalists at the ICF Canoe Slalom World Championships
21st-century Italian people